Arenal Tempisque Conservation Area, is an administrative area which is managed by SINAC for the purposes of conservation in the northwest part of Costa Rica, near the Arenal Volcano and covering part of the Cordillera de Tilarán and Cordillera de Guanacaste. It contains a number of National Parks, Wildlife refuges and Protected Zones.  The area was previously known as Arenal Tilarán Conservation Area.

Protected areas
 Abangares River Basin Protected Zone
 Arenal-Monteverde Protected Zone
 Barbudal Hillocks Biological Reserve
 Cipancí Wildlife Refuge
 Madrigal Lake Wetland
 Miravalles Jorge Manuel Dengo National Park
 Miravalles Protected Zone
 Palo Verde National Park
 Taboga Forest Reserve
 Tenorio Protected Zone
 Tenorio Volcano National Park
 Zapandí Riverine Wetlands

See also 
 Arenal Huetar Norte Conservation Area, where Arenal Volcano National Park is managed. 
 Curi Cancha Wildlife Refuge, a private wildlife refuge located near the area.
 Alberto Manuel Brenes Biological Reserve, previously managed in this area, now in Central Conservation Area

References  

Conservation Areas of Costa Rica